Julie Calvert (born 23 September 1964 in Melbourne, Victoria) is an Australian former cricket player.

Calvert played domestic cricket for the Victorian state women's cricket team between 1986 and 1997. She played eleven matches in the inaugural season of the Women's National Cricket League.

Calvert played six One Day Internationals for the Australia national women's cricket team.

References

External links
 Julie Calvert at southernstars.org.au

Living people
1964 births
Australia women One Day International cricketers
Victoria women cricketers
Cricketers from Melbourne